Turza Wielka may refer to the following places:
Turza Wielka, Mława County in Masovian Voivodeship (east-central Poland)
Turza Wielka, Płock County in Masovian Voivodeship (east-central Poland)
Turza Wielka, Warmian-Masurian Voivodeship (north Poland)